The Governorate of Terra Australis or Governorate of Pedro Sancho de la Hoz was a Spanish Governorate of the Crown of Castile created in 1539 which was granted to Pedro Sancho de la Hoz and consisted in all the territories to the south of the Strait of Magellan until the South Pole and to the East and West the borders were the ones specified in the Treaty of Tordesillas and Zaragoza and respectively.

History
The Governorate was created by King Charles V, establishing the adelantado Pedro Sancho de la Hoz as its first governor, captain general, and chief justice as soon as he took possession of the assigned territories.

However, this did not materialize, and the adelantado ceded his rights on August 2, 1540, to Pedro de Valdivia while both were in Atacama after having been pardoned multiple times by the latter after de la Hoz tried to assassinate him.

Valdivia was the governor of Terra Australis before being appointed governor of Chile, a Governorate that in its beginnings covered from the 27th degree south latitude to the Strait of Magellan, as a result of this, his interest arose to explore the pass and merge Chile with the Governorate of Terra Australis. In 1553, the already governor of Chile sent Jerónimo de Alderete to the Iberian Peninsula, with the mission of obtaining an extension of his governorship and joining it to the one he had obtained from Sancho de Hoz, Valdivia died on December 25 of the same year.

Incorporation of Terra Australis to Chile

Jerónimo de Alderete achieved his mission at the Court by obtaining the territories south of the strait for himself, requesting the territories immediately south of the Strait of Magellan while Valdivia's death was not yet known. Alderete's request covered "from the said Strait of Magellan along the coast of the southern sea up to three hundred leagues, with all that the said strait lasts", it is estimated that Valdivia authorized Alderete to make this request.

The monarchs granted the extension of Valdivia's governorship to the Strait of Magellan and Alderete's petition in two royal decrees of September 29, 1554, in the one referring to the southern territory it says: "It has seemed to us to grant as we hereby grant to the said Captain Geronimo de Alderete the governorship of the land that as the said strait is on the other side of the said Strait of Magellan". After this, the Council of the Indies would draw the limits of the portion of the Terra Australis granted to Alderete, complementing the details in question by means of a capitulation.

However, the news of the death of Pedro de Valdivia reached the Iberian Peninsula and with this, Alderete inherited all the territory of the Governorate of Terra Australis (not only the one he requested) and on May 29, 1555, he obtained through another royal decree the provinces of Chile, its Patagonian territories, in addition to incorporating the territories of Terra Australis to the kingdom of Chile of which he was also named governor. In this document he was asked to: "take possession in our name of the lands and provinces that fall within the demarcation of the Crown of Castile, on the other side of the said strait".

At the end of 1554 King Charles I sends a letter to the Council of the Indies expressing: "and with regard to the land on the other side of the Strait of Magellan, which we have also given and granted in governorship to the said Geronimo de Alderete, we have ordered him, for the reasons that have been written to you, to send some ships from the said province of Chile to take notice and report on the quality and usefulness of that land, since for the present he is not to go in person or go to conquer or populate it, because at present, having to attend to what is in Chile, the one and the other could not be done, and the other could not be done, the one and the other could not be done together".

In the eight-month period between September 1554 and May 1555, the regions of the Terra Australis requested by Alderete near the Strait of Magellan were under a ruler different from that of Chile, to later be definitively incorporated into the latter once Alderete was named governor of Chile. On April 7, 1556, during his return trip, he died of yellow fever in Panama.

His successor, García Hurtado de Mendoza, sent Juan Ladrillero, in 1558 to take possession of both shores of the Strait of Magellan. When Francisco de Villagra was appointed, he was also asked to take possession of the lands south of the Strait in the Royal Decree that appointed him, leaving the south pole as the southern limit of the Governorate of Chile, based on the title transferred from the Governorate of Terra Australis.

Governorates in Hispanic America

After the territorial division of South America between Spain and Portugal, the Peruvian Hispanic administration was divided into six entities: 
Province of Tierra Firme, included the Caribbean Coast, Central America, the Pacific Coast of Colombia and Mexico.
Governorate of New Castile, consisting of the territories from roughly the Ecuadorian-Colombian border in the north to Cuzco in the south.
Governorate of New Toledo, forming the previous southern half of the Inca empire, stretching towards central Chile.
Governorate of New Andalusia, which was not formally conquered by Spain until decades later.
Governorate of New León, the southernmost part of the continent until the Strait of Magellan.
Governorate of Terra Australis, territories from the south of the Strait of Magellan to the South Pole.

This territorial division set the basis for the Hispanic administration of South America for several decades. It was formally dissolved in 1544, when King Charles I sent his personal envoy, Blasco Núñez Vela, to govern the newly founded Viceroyalty of Peru that replaced the governorates.

Borders

See also
Chilean Antarctic Territory
History of Antarctica
Terra Australis
Spanish colonization attempt of the Strait of Magellan

References

Governorates of the Spanish Empire
Former colonies in South America
Former Spanish colonies
Former political divisions related to Argentina
Spanish colonization of the Americas
States and territories established in 1539
1539 establishments in South America
1539 establishments in Antarctica
1539 establishments in the Spanish Empire
History of Antarctica
History of South America